Doringkruin is a predominantly White residential suburb 5 km north east of Klerksdorp in the North West province of South Africa.

References

Populated places in the City of Matlosana Local Municipality